Pinus radiata (syn. Pinus insignis), the Monterey pine, insignis pine or radiata pine, is a species of pine native to the Central Coast of California and Mexico (Guadalupe Island and Cedros island). It is an evergreen conifer in the family Pinaceae.

P. radiata is a versatile, fast-growing, medium-density softwood, suitable for a wide range of uses. Its silviculture reflects a century of research, observation and practice. It is often considered a model for growers of other plantation species. It is the most widely planted pine in the world, valued for rapid growth and desirable lumber and pulp qualities.

Although P. radiata is extensively cultivated as a plantation timber in many temperate parts of the world, it faces serious threats in its natural range, due to the introduction of pine pitch canker (Fusarium circinatum).

Description

The bark is fissured and dark grey to brown. When not cut short by disease or harvesting, it has a lifespan of 80 to 90 years.

The specific epiphet radiata refers to the cracks which radiate from the umbo of the cone scales.

It is closely related to bishop pine and knobcone pine, hybridizing readily with both species; it is distinguished from the former by needles in threes (not pairs), and from both by the cones not having a sharp spine on the scales.

The modern tree is vastly different from the native tree of Monterey. In plantations the tree is commonly planted at 4 square meter spacing on a wide variety of landscapes from flat to moderately steep hills. Because of selective breeding and more recently the extensive use of growth factor seedlings, forests planted since the 1990s have very straight tall trunks without the problem of twin leaders. The trees are pruned in three lifts so that the lower two-thirds of a mature tree is free of branches and hence of knots.

Distribution and habitat
In the United States, it is native to three very limited areas located in Santa Cruz, Monterey, and San Luis Obispo Counties.

In Mexico, it is found on two islands in the Pacific Ocean, Guadalupe Island and Cedros Island. On Cedros Island, the pines are more abundant, being found in far greater numbers partly due to the lack of feral goats. In both cases, the pines seem to be heavily dependent on locations with a high frequency of fog.

In Australia, New Zealand, and Spain it is the leading introduced tree and in Argentina, Chile, Uruguay, Kenya, and South Africa it is a major plantation species. It is also an introduced tree on the world's most remote inhabited island, Tristan da Cunha.

Taxonomy

Subdivisions 
Two varieties of this species have been recognized, each corresponding to the island they are endemic to in Baja California. Some authors lump these taxa and do not recognize infraspecies.

On both islands it is the only pine species, and one of the few tree species. Compared to the mainland species, which are mostly three-needled, the insular varieties have their needles in bundles of two. Their cones are also smaller, and they show greater wind resistance in regards to wind-induced toppling.

 Pinus radiata var. binata (Engelm.) Lemmon — Commonly known as the Guadalupe Island pine. Endemic to Guadalupe Island.
 Pinus radiata var. cedrosensis (J.T. Howell) Silba — Commonly known as the Cedros Island pine. Endemic to Cedros Island.

Ecology

P. radiata is adapted to cope with stand-killing fire disturbance. Its cones are serotinous, i.e. they remain closed until opened by the heat of a forest fire; the abundant seeds are then discharged to regenerate on the burned forest floor. The cones may also burst open in hot weather.

In its native range, P. radiata is associated with characteristic flora and fauna. It is the co-dominant canopy tree, together with Cupressus macrocarpa, which naturally occurs only in coastal Monterey County. Furthermore, one of the pine forests in Monterey, California, was the discovery site for Hickman's potentilla, an endangered species. Piperia yadonii, a rare species of orchid, is endemic to the same pine forest adjacent to Pebble Beach. In its native range, P. radiata is a principal host for the dwarf mistletoe Arceuthobium littorum.

The habitat of the pines on Cedros Island contrasts greatly with the desert scrub on other parts of the island, forming zones of abrupt transition. The numerous groves form a mostly-monotypic forest of the species, with very few other plants besides seedlings emerging in the understory. In some areas, the edges of the forest form a zone that supports chaparral species, including Malosma laurina, Diplacus stellatus, and the endemic Eriogonum molle. With their large surfaces to condense fog, the pines create irrigation for themselves and their associates. Towards the far northern end of the island, a succulent community mostly consisting of Dudleya is found, and the endemic Dudleya pachyphytum can sometimes be found growing under the pines in the ecotone.

A remnant P. radiata stand in Pacific Grove is a prime wintering habitat of the monarch butterfly.

In South Africa, the tree is a threat to already scarce water resources. The tree has remarkable roots. Monterey pine roots will reach downward as far as physically permitted by subterranean conditions. Efforts to remove large quantities of the non-native tree in areas of South Africa have resulted in significant increases in accessible water.

Conservation status

Fungal disease
The three remaining wild stands of var. radiata (Monterey pine proper) are infected and under threat of extirpation from pine pitch canker caused by Fusarium circinatum, a fungal disease native to the southeast United States and found (in 1986) to have been introduced to California. When trees begin to die of the disease, they attract bark beetles which provide a pathway for infection of other trees. In some stands, 80–90% of trees are infected. If the disease is introduced in agroforestry areas dependent upon P. radiata, such as New Zealand, it could have catastrophic effects in those countries as well.

Sphaeropsis blight (Diplodia pinea) infects P. radiata in California and causes serious damage to plantations of the species in New Zealand, Australia and South Africa, especially after hail damage to growing tips.

Baja California

On Guadalupe Island, var. binata is critically endangered. Most of the population was destroyed as tens of thousands of feral goats ate binata seedlings and caused soil erosion from the mid-19th century until just a few years ago. The older trees gradually died off until by 2001–2002 the population stood at only one hundred. With a program to remove the goats essentially complete by 2005, hundreds of young Guadalupe pines have started to grow up in habitat fenced after 2001, the first significant new growth in about 150 years. Possible accidental introduction of pine pitch canker is considered the biggest threat at present to the survival of the Guadalupe Island pine population. The University of California's Russell Reservation forestry research station hosts an orchard planted with 73 P. radiata seedlings from Guadalupe Island and plays an important role in conserving the binata variety.

Cultivation

Australia
 

P. radiata was introduced to Australia in the 1870s. It is "the dominant tree species in the Australian plantation estate" – so much so that many Australians are concerned by the resulting loss of native wildlife habitat. The species is widely regarded as an environmental weed across southeastern and southwestern Australia and the removal of individual plants beyond plantations is encouraged.

Chile
P. radiata has greatly replaced the Valdivian temperate rain forests, where vast plantations have been planted for timber, again displacing the native forests. In 2001, this species produced 5,580,724 cubic meters of lumber, or 95% of Chile's total lumber production. In 2021 1.3 million of Chile's 2.3 million ha of forest plantations were planted with Pinus radiata.

New Zealand
The Monterey pine (always called "Radiata Pine" or Pinus radiata in New Zealand) was first introduced into New Zealand in 1859 and today 89% of the country's plantation forests are of this species. This includes the Kaingaroa Forest (on the central plateau of the North Island), which is one of the largest planted forests in the world. Mass plantings became common from 1900 in the Rotorua area where prison labour was used. In some areas (particularly areas that were formerly grazed that have had stock removed) it is considered an invasive species (termed a wilding conifer or more commonly wilding pine) where it has escaped from plantations. It is the most extensively used wood in New Zealand.

Use of pine in construction did not become widespread until forced by wartime shortages. It had been used in Southland from about 1920, but doubts were being expressed about it as late as 1945, when at least one MP considered it only suitable for interior studding. Experiments in pressure treatment with water-soluble preservatives were made from 1943.

Spain
In the Iberian Peninsula since the nineteenth century they have been introduced mainly in the north area in order to take advantage of their wood for the manufacture of paper pulp and for shoring work in coal mines. It is found in low altitude areas of the Autonomous Communities of Galicia, Asturias, Cantabria, the Basque Country, and in the north of the Canary Islands.

P. radiata forests have a negative effect on local ecology. In its plantations there are usually no other tree species, while its shady undergrowth does not allow the existence of a rich stratum of scrub. 13% of the wood cut annually in Spain comes from this pine.

United Kingdom
The cultivar P. radiata (Aurea Group) 'Aurea' has gained the Royal Horticultural Society's Award of Garden Merit.

United States
P. radiata is widely used in private gardens and public landscapes in temperate California, and similar climates around the world. It is particularly commonly grown as a landscape tree in coastal areas of California outside of its native range, where the climate is virtually identical to its native range. Its fast growth makes it ideal for landscapes and forestry; in a good situation, P. radiata can reach its full height in 40 years or so. Though a combination of biotic and abiotic factors determines the natural distribution of P. radiata, humans have broadly expanded its distribution up and down the California coast.

Uses 

As timber P. radiata is suitable for a wide variety of uses, and has a resinous fragrance while being worked. It holds screws and nails well and takes paint and stain without difficulty, and modern kiln dried timber is very easy to work. It is about 1/3 heavier than dried western red cedar. It is brittle when bent, so does not have the same load-bearing features as Oregon pine (Douglas fir, Pseudotsuga).

P. radiata is used in house construction as weatherboards, posts, beams or plywood, in fencing, retaining walls, for concrete formers. It is also used to a limited extent in boat building where untreated ply is sometimes used, but must be encased in epoxy resin to exclude moisture.

It is available treated with a range of chemical salts, or untreated. Chemical salt treatment is well proven and such timber is frequently used in the ground as posts and poles as part of structures such as retaining walls and pole houses. The name applied to this treatment is tanalized wood. H1 and H2 treatment is suited to indoor use. H3 is the standard house timber and this grade is used for fence palings. H4 and H5 are the standard for inground use. In New Zealand a 1995 change to no longer require boron treatment in house framing timber, was a key factor in the leaky homes crisis, but since 2003 a series of changes have now improved the regulations.

Lower grade timber is converted to pulp to make newsprint. Higher grade timber is used in house construction. P. radiata is used chipped to make particle board sheets, commonly used in flooring. Other sheet products are hardboard, softboard and ply. Most ply is structural and available in  sizes. A small amount of higher grade ply is used to produce thinner ply suitable for furniture, cabinet work and boat building. This is knot and crack free and glued with resorcinol waterproof glue. Since the 1990s finger jointed joinery-grade wood has become available in up to  lengths in a wide range of profiles.

In 1958, New Zealand boat designer Des Townson started building 186 , cold-moulded Zephyr-class dinghies, using P. radiata. In 2011 these hand-built boats fetched very high prices and were generally in excellent condition.

The bark is used as a substrate for potting and re-potting orchids.

P. radiata is the most common species of Christmas tree in Australia and New Zealand.

In California, P. radiata is commonly planted to block wind or noise, or for ornamental reasons.

References

Bibliography
 León de la Luz, José Luis; Rebman, Jon P. & Oberbauer, Thomas (2003). On the urgency of conservation on Guadalupe Island, Mexico: is it a lost paradise? Biodiversity and Conservation 12(5): 1073–1082.  (HTML abstract)

External links

  Calflora Database: Pinus radiata (Monterey pine)
 Jepson Manual eFlora (TJM2) treatment of Pinus radiata
 Conifers.org – Pinus radiata
 US Forest Service
 UC CalPhotos gallery – Pinus radiata
 Pinus radiata – genetic conservation units European Forest Genetic Resources Programme (EUFORGEN)

radiata
Flora of California
Trees of Baja California
Trees of Mexican Pacific Islands
Trees of the Southwestern United States
Trees of Mediterranean climate
Trees of mild maritime climate
Natural history of the California chaparral and woodlands
Natural history of Monterey County, California
Endangered biota of Mexico
Garden plants of North America
Ornamental trees